Glenea carneipes is a species of beetle in the family Cerambycidae. It was described by Chevrolat in 1855. It is known from Nigeria and the Democratic Republic of the Congo.

Varietas
 Glenea carneipes var. postquadrimaculata Breuning, 1958
 Glenea carneipes var. sexvittata Hintz, 1911

References

carneipes
Beetles described in 1855